Denkmäler der Tonkunst in Österreich (Monuments of Fine Austrian Music) (1894–) is a historical edition of music from Austria covering the Renaissance, Baroque, and Classical periods. The most recent volume in the edition was published in 2017.

Volumes (Bände) 1 to 83 of DTÖ were published in annual issues (Jahrgänge) I to XXXV from 1894 to 1938.

Parallels may be drawn between the historical edition entitled Denkmäler deutscher Tonkunst (DdT) (two series, 1892–1931, and 1900–1931), and DTÖ. The second series of DdT was separately titled Denkmäler der Tonkunst in Bayern (DTB). A new revised edition of DdT was published between 1957 and 1961. A new revised edition of DTB was started in 1962.

Table of contents
The publishers' names are abbreviated for space-saving: AK, Akademische Druck- und Verlagsanstalt; AR, Artaria & Co., Vienna; Ö, Österreichischer Bundesverlag; and, U, Universal-Edition.

Alphabetical list of editors, and volumes
Abert, Hermann, 44a 

Adler, Guido (1855-1941), 6, 7, 8, 9, 11, 13, 14. u. 15, 19, 20, 21, 22, 38, 46, 49, 58, 59

Angerer, Paul, 150

Bennett, Lawrence, 157

Bezecný, Emil, 10, 12, 24, 28, 30, 40, 48, 51. u. 52

Botstiber, Hugo, 17, 27, 74

Brosche, Günter, 136, 142-144

Duda, Erich, 155

Einstein, Alfred, 77, 82

Erhardt, Tassilo, 156

Eybl, Martin, 149

Federhofer, Hellmut, 90

Ficker, Rudolf, 53, 61, 76

Fischer, Wilhelm, 39

Flotzinger, Rudolf, 120, 147. u. 148

Gál, Hans, 63, 68

Geiringer, Karl, 70

Glossner, Gustav Adolf, 1

Glüxam, DagmAr, 153

Gruber, Gernot, 133

Haas, Robert, 36, 42-44, 55, 57, 60, 64, 66

Habert, Johann Evangelist, 1, 3, 5

Hamann, Brigitte (1940-2016), 142-144. 

Hettrick, Jane Schatkin, 146

Hofer, Norbert, 88

Horwitz, Karl, 31

Huigens, Pater Caecilianus (1878-1966), 73

John, Rudolf, 90, 91

Kapp, OskAr, 33

Klafsky, Anton Maria, 45, 62

Klima, Josef, 84

Knaus, Herwig, 115

Koczirz, Adolf, 37, 50, 72, 84

Koller, Oswald, 14. u. 15, 18, 22, 38

Kosch, Franz, 83

Kraus, Hedwig, 54, 79

Litschauer, Walburga, 140. u. 141. 

Luithlen, Victor, 81

Luntz, Erwin, 23, 25

Mandyczewski, Eusebius (1857-1929), 26, 75

Mantuani, Joseph, 12, 24, 30, 40, 48, 51. u. 52

Maschek, Hermann, 54, 79

Monterosso, Raffaello, 110

Nettl, Paul, 56, 92

Niiyama-Kalicki, Fumiko, 152

Noé, Alfred, 156

Opatrny, Alexander, 154

Orel, Alfred, 53, 65

Pass, Walter, 122, 126, 132, 152

Perger, Lothar Herbert, 29

Pfalz, Anton (1885-1958), 87

Pisk, Paul Amadeus, 78, 94. u. 95, 117, 119

Plepelits, Karl, 132

Rabl, Walter, 10, 28

Rainer, IngomAr, 153

Rainer, Werner, 131

Reidinger, Friedrich, 92

Riedel, Karl, 31

Rietsch, Heinrich (1860-1927), 2, 4, 41, 47

Rosenthal, Karl August, 69, 80

Sachs, Hans, 87

Schatz, Joseph, 18

Schenk, Erich, 85, 89, 93, 96, 97, 105, 106. u. 107, 111. u. 112, 124

Schmidt, Anton W., 16

Schmieder, Wolfgang (1901-1990), 71

Schneider, Constantin, 80, 91, 137

Schnürl, Karl, 84

Schoenbaum, Camillo, 101. u. 102, 121 

Scholz, Rudolf, 129

Schulze, Stefan, 138. u. 139. 

Schütz, Karl, 129

Sehnal, Jiří (b. 1931), 127, 151

Seiffert, Max, 17

Senn, Walter, 86

Steinhardt, Milton, 98, 100, 103. u. 104, 108. u. 109, 113. u. 114, 116, 118, 123 

Webern, Anton von (1883-1945), 32

Weigl, Karl (1881-1949), 67

Wellesz, Egon (1885-1974), 34. u. 35. 

Werner, Eric (1901-1988), 134

Wessely, Helen, 128, 130, 135

Wessely, OthmAr, 99, 125, 128, 130, 135, 149

Winkler, Klaus, 137

Wlcek, Walter, 155

Wolf, Johannes (1869-1947), 28, 32

Zeman, Herbert, 121

References

Apel, W. (1970) Editions, historical. Harvard Dictionary of Music. 2nd ed. London: Heinemann Educational Books, Ltd.

External links
Denkmäler der Tonkunst in Österreich at the International Music Score Library Project

Collected editions of classical composers
Classical music lists
Austrian books
Music books